PDZK1-interacting protein 1 is a protein that in humans is encoded by the PDZK1IP1 gene.

Interactions 

PDZK1IP1 has been shown to interact with PDZK1.

References

Further reading

External links